Pais Maravilla (In English: Wonderland), is the third studio album by the Latin jazz Mexican singer Magos Herrera.

Background and theme
Three of the nine tracks inspired by Magos Herrera and the reminiscence of a classic Cuban lullaby "Drume Negrita" by Eliseo Grenet. Includes some Portuguese and Spanish versions as well as a remix.

In 2003, Magos announces its third highly successful album "Pais Maravilla" / Suave Records. Since its launch this disc is positioned at the top of the Mexican sales in jazz and world music as "disc of the week" by Image 90.5 and 107.9 FM. I took the tour in Mexico, Spain and Japan to give concerts in forums such as the Chamber Galileo Galilei, and Suristán and FNAC Callao in Madrid and in Osaka, Tokyo and Chigasaki in Japan.

Critical reception
Evan C. Gutierrez of Allmusic says: Magos Herrera joins the groundswell of Latina vocal talent with her 2004 release, País Maravilla (Wonderland). With a wide spectrum of colors in her palette, including dark and evocative harmonies, earthy Brazilian rhythms, bright Afro-Cuban influences, and the smoky tones of jazz, Herrera paints an enchanting picture. The instrumentation is warm and acoustic, with a seductive organic quality, and consistently top-notch. The Mexican songstress herself has a husky, emotive sound that draws the listener in close enough to whisper. Her melodic sense and sensitivity make up for her evident lack of raw power. She commands attention at simmering intensity; there is no need to boil over. Though the production team is made up of virtual unknowns, and Herrera is a newcomer herself, few would guess as much when hearing the record. There is a maturity and taste present that defy the cast's lack of experience. Seldom comes along an international debut as subtle and intelligent. Magos Herrera is a talent to be enjoyed today and to keep an eye on tomorrow.

Track listing
 "Agua" (Water)
 "Somos" (We Are)
 "País Maravilla" (Wonderland)
 "Serafín" (Serafin)
 "Princesa Caballero" (Princess/Knight)
 "La Espera" (The Longing)
 "Necesito Un Sol" (Need a Sun)
 "Son Cotidiano" (Daily "Son")
 "Luna Menguante" (Decreasing Moon)
 "Drumme Negrita" (Cuban Lullaby)
 "A Espera" (La Espera - Portuguese Version) (The Longing)
 "Somos (We Are) (Remix 1)
 "Somos (We Are) (Remix 2)

References

Magos Herrera albums
2003 albums